Morris "Moe" Gardner Jr. (born August 10, 1968) is a former American football defensive tackle.  He played professionally in the National Football League (NFL) for the Atlanta Falcons (1991–1996). Moe Gardner graduated from Cathedral High School in Indianapolis, Indiana.  He attended the University of Illinois at Urbana–Champaign where he was a two-time consensus All-American in 1989 and 1990. He was selected as the only active player named to Illinois' All-Century team in 1990 and ranks second in school history in career tackles for loss.  He was named Big Ten Defensive Player of the Year earning the honor in both 1989 and 1990.  He was also named as a finalist for both the Outland Trophy and the Lombardi Award.  Gardner was drafted by the Atlanta Falcons in 1991. 1993 is arguably considered to be his strongest season. That year, he recorded 128 tackles leading the Falcons’ defensive linemen and finishing second overall on the team. In January 2022, Gardner was announced as a member of the 2022 class of the College Football Hall of Fame.

References

1968 births
Living people
American football defensive tackles
Atlanta Falcons players
Illinois Fighting Illini football players
All-American college football players
Players of American football from Indianapolis